Takeo Kimura (born 25 October 1943) is a Japanese weightlifter. He competed in the men's lightweight event at the 1968 Summer Olympics.

References

1943 births
Living people
Japanese male weightlifters
Olympic weightlifters of Japan
Weightlifters at the 1968 Summer Olympics
Sportspeople from Fukushima Prefecture
Asian Games medalists in weightlifting
Asian Games silver medalists for Japan
Weightlifters at the 1966 Asian Games
Medalists at the 1966 Asian Games
20th-century Japanese people
21st-century Japanese people